Arinos is a municipality in northern Minas Gerais state in Brazil. Arinos is located east of the Federal District on the Urucuia River, a major tributary of the São Francisco.  The city is 333 km from Brasília.

The municipality belongs to the  statistical microregion of Unaí Microregion, which has 9 municipalities.  Neighboring municipalities are:
North: Formosa
West: Buritis and Unaí
East: Urucuia and Chapada Gaúcha

Arinos has poor highway connections leading east to the Sao Francisco river and to the state capital of Belo Horizonte, but a better road leading west to the national capital of Brasília.  Few of the roads in the town are paved.  There is a fully paved road (BR-479) leading west to Cabeceiras to join the important BR-020, 22 kilometers east of Formosa.  The distance is approximately 165 kilometers.  Another paved road leads west, then southwest to Garapuava, and continues southwest to the important regional center of Unaí.

The economy
The economy is based on cattle raising and agriculture, especially the cultivation of soybeans, sorghum, and corn.  
Industrial establishments: 14 (2005)
Commercial retail establishments: 245 (commerce, vehicle repair, personal and domestic objects)
Restaurant and hotel establishments: 14
Financial institutions: 1 (2005)
Motor vehicles: 908 automobiles and 103 pickup trucks (2007)

Main agricultural crops in 2006)
Rice: 2,050 ha. 
Corn: 3,500 ha. 
Soybeans: 4,00 ha. 
Sorghum: 200 ha. 
Beans: 900 ha.Livestock raising in 2006Cattle: 92,509 headFarm data in 2006'''
Number of farms: 1,674
Total area: 303,791
Planted area: 27,500 ha. 
Area of natural pasture: 161,587
Salaried workers in agriculture: 375
Workers related to producer: 4,722

Health and education
Health clinics: 8 (2 private and 6 public) 
Hospitals: 1 public with 31 beds
Number of primary schools: 18
Primary school enrollment: 3,817
Number of middle and secondary schools: 5
Middle and secondary school enrollment: 996
Municipal Human Development Index: 0.711 Frigoletto

Part of the municipality of Arinos is inside the Grande Sertão Veredas National Park, which lies to the north on an unpaved highway between Arinos and Formosa.

References

Municipalities in Minas Gerais